6-Hydroxymelatonin (6-OHM) is a naturally occurring, endogenous, major active metabolite of melatonin. Similar to melatonin, 6-OHM is a full agonist of the MT1 and MT2 receptors. It is also an antioxidant and neuroprotective, and is even more potent in this regard relative to melatonin.

See also
 N-Acetylserotonin (normelatonin)
 5-Methoxytryptamine

References

Acetamides
Antioxidants
Biogenic amines
Circadian rhythm
Hormones of the pineal gland
Melatonin receptor agonists
Neuroprotective agents
Neurotransmitters
Phenols
Tryptamine alkaloids
Mexamines